DNSC may refer to:
 Directoratul Național de Securitate Cibernetică
 Danish National Space Center
 Dansyl chloride
 Davao del Norte State College, a public college in New Visayas, Panabo City, Philippines
 Defense National Stockpile Center
 Doctor of Nursing Science